The Schwarzbach (in German: Großer Schwarzbach) is a river of Bavaria, Germany. It is a tributary of the Reschbach north of Mauth.

See also
List of rivers of Bavaria

Rivers of Bavaria
Rivers of Germany